{{Infobox sportsperson
| name             = Buddy Edelen
| full_name        = Leonard Graves Edelen
| nationality      = American
| birth_date       = 
| birth_place      = Harrodsburg, Kentucky, U.S.
| death_date       = 
| death_place      = Tulsa, Oklahoma, U.S.
| height           = 5 ft 10 in
| weight           = 141 lb
| sport            = Long-distance running
| event            = Marathon
| collegeteam      = University of Minnesota
| pb               = Marathon: 2:14:28 10000 meters: 28:00.8  5000 meters: 13:54.4   2 miles: 8:57.4i
}}Leonard Graves "Buddy" Edelen''' (September 22, 1937 – February 19, 1997) was an American marathoner. Based in England for most of his prime competitive years, in 1963 Edelen became the first man to run a marathon faster than 2 hours and 15 minutes when he set a world record of 2:14:28. Edelen also won the 1964 U.S. Olympic marathon trials and represented the U.S. in the 1964 Summer Olympics in Tokyo, Japan.

Biography
While born in Kentucky, Edelen attended high school in St. Louis Park, Minnesota, before graduating from Washington High School in Sioux Falls, South Dakota, in 1955.  He then attended the University of Minnesota.

As a Golden Gopher, Edelen ran cross country and track. He finished top-10 in the NCAA Men's Division I Cross Country Championship twice: In 1956 he placed 9th in 20:33  and in 1957 he placed 4th in 19:44. He set the national record for the four-mile race.

In 1997, Edelen died of cancer at age 59.

In 2001 was inducted into the Gopher Athletics Hall of Fame.
In 2016, he was elected into the National Track and Field Hall of Fame.

Marathons 
Edelen's promise in the marathon was evident early in his career. In 1962, he finished 4th at the Fukuoka Marathon in an American Record time of 2:18:57, making him the first American to run under 2:20 for the marathon. He was also the first American under 30:00 for the 10,000 m run.

On June 15, 1963 Edelen ran 2:14:28 at the Polytechnic Marathon (run from Windsor to Chiswick, England) to establish a new World Record. That record stood just two days short of a year, as England's Basil Heatley ran 2:13:55 at the 1964 Polytechnic Marathon (which was held on June 13). Edelen was the first American to hold the world record since 1925, and (excepting Alberto Salazar's 2:08:13 at the 1981 New York City Marathon, which later proved to be short) the last until naturalized American Khalid Khannouchi (originally from Morocco) broke his own World Record at the London Marathon in 2002.

After his record run 1963, Edelen also won the Košice Peace Marathon in Slovakia in a course-record time of 2:15:09; that record would stand for fifteen years.

The following year, Edelen won the U.S. Olympic Trials marathon by nearly twenty minutes, and went on to finish 6th in the marathon at the Tokyo Olympic games.

In 2016, he was elected into the National Track and Field Hall of Fame.

Achievements

References

 Sporting Heroes

Further reading
  (An "athletic biography" of Edelen.)

External links 
 
 
 

1937 births
1997 deaths
American male marathon runners
Athletes (track and field) at the 1964 Summer Olympics
Olympic track and field athletes of the United States
People from Harrodsburg, Kentucky
World record setters in athletics (track and field)
University of Minnesota alumni